Bachelor's Vegetable Store is a South Korean television series starring Ji Chang-wook, Wang Ji-hye, Kim Young-kwang, Park Soo-jin and Hwang Shin-hye. It aired on Channel A from December 21, 2011 to March 8, 2012 on Wednesdays and Thursdays at 21:20 for 24 episodes.

It is based on the same-titled book published in 2003 that chronicles the real-life success story of how a young man named Lee Young-seok turned a small 350-square-feet vegetable store in 1998 into a nationwide franchise with 33 branches.

Plot
Han Tae-yang is a hardworking, talented young man who will do anything to make his tiny vegetable stand a success. He hires a couple of "lost boys" who become his employees and friends: Nam Yoo-bong, a successful yet lonely farmer with zero love life; Lee Chan-sol, an idol trainee whose talent agency throws him out after nine years due to a hushed scandal, so he ends up working in a host club; Yoon Ho-jae, a certifiable genius with a lack of social skills that makes him unhireable to big companies; and Jung Ki-young, a homeless man who doesn't talk much.

Tae-yang also falls in love with Mok Ga-on, but she is hiding a huge secret. She is actually Jin Jin-shim, an orphaned girl. When her friend, the real Mok Ga-on, died when they were teenagers, Ga-on's ambitious mother Choi Kang-sun took Jin-shim in and told her to pretend to be her daughter, since Ga-on is the illegitimate daughter of a chaebol businessman. Desperate for a family, Jin-shim agreed, and now named Ga-on, she has a devoted but toxic relationship with Kang-sun. Ga-on also has feelings for Tae-yang, but she is torn between him and a wealthy heir, Lee Seul-woo.

Cast
Ji Chang-wook as Han Tae-yang
Oh Jae-moo as young Tae-yang
Wang Ji-hye as Mok Ga-on/Jin Jin-shim
Chae Bin as young Jin-shim
Park So-young as young Ga-on
Kim Young-kwang as Lee Seul-woo
Park Soo-jin as Jung Dan-bi
Hwang Shin-hye as Choi Kang-sun
Lee Se-young as Han Tae-in
Roh Jeong-eui as young Tae-in
Park Won-sook as Hwang Soo-ja
Jang Hang-sun as Jung Goo-gwang 
Kim Do-yeon as Yeon Boon-hong
Jeon No-min as Mok In-beom 
Lee Kwang-soo as Nam Yoo-bong
Shin Won-ho as Lee Chan-sol 
Song Ji-hyuk as Yoon Ho-jae
Noh Sung-ha as Jung Ki-young
Lee Eun as Hong Jung-ah
Sa Mi-ja as Park Geum-soon
?? as driver of Ga On's mom

References

External links
Bachelor's Vegetable Store official Channel A website 

Channel A television dramas
2011 South Korean television series debuts
2011 South Korean television series endings
Korean-language television shows
Television shows based on South Korean novels